South from Granada: Seven Years in an Andalusian Village is an autobiographical book by Gerald Brenan, first published in 1957.

Brenan, a fringe member of the Bloomsbury Group, moved to Spain in 1919 and lived there on and off for the rest of his life. The book is an example of travel literature, mixing an autobiographical account of his life in Yegen, the village where he found his first home in Spain, with detailed background information about the Alpujarras region of Andalusia. He describes visits to his home by Virginia Woolf, Lytton Strachey, and Dora Carrington.

Film version
South from Granada has been adapted into a film, Al sur de Granada (2003), directed by Fernando Colomo.  The film includes some biographical material not in the original book.

References

English non-fiction books
1957 non-fiction books
British biographies
Books about Spain
Books about writers
Hamish Hamilton books